Bevu Bella is a 1993 Indian Kannada-language romantic action film written and directed by S. Narayan. The film was produced by J. Girija in the banner of Jyothi Krishna Movies. The film stars Jaggesh and Ragini Roopa Sree in the lead roles while Lokesh, Ajay Kumar, director S. Narayan himself, and Shobharaj essay other important characters. The film has a musical score by Hamsalekha. 

The title of the film is taken from the 1963 film starring Uday Kumar.
The film opened to largely positive reviews and became a Blockbuster. The film is considered to be one of the best films of director S. Narayan.

Cast
Jaggesh
Ragini
Lokesh
Ajay Kumar
S. Narayan
Shobharaj
Janakamma
Padma Kumata

Soundtrack

Release
Bevu Bella produced by Bangalore based film production company Jyothi Krishna Movies received a U certificate with 4 cuts from the Indian Censor Board, the certificate dated 21 September 1993.
 The film received a positive response and became a big commercial success catapulting S. Narayan and Jaggesh to immense fame in the KFI.

Jaggesh tweeted in Twitter that the film played a significant part in his life. He mentioned that the remuneration he got for the film helped him buy a piece of land in Malleshwaram and construct his dream house in Bangalore. Popular makeup artist Uma Maheshwar mentioned that in his initial struggling days he happened to meet Jaggesh and work in his films. In the process, he met senior make-up artist Mysore Venkatesh and happened to learn from him. He added that he received an amount of 100 per day which was a huge amount as he used to work for just 10 per day.

Reference

1993 films
1990s Kannada-language films
Indian action drama films
Films directed by S. Narayan
Films scored by Hamsalekha
1993 action drama films